Zvārtava Parish is an administrative territorial entity of Valka Municipality, Latvia.

Towns, villages and settlements of Zvārtava Parish 

Parishes of Latvia
Valka Municipality